Penns may refer to:

Penns, Mississippi, a village in Lowndes County
Penns Grove, New Jersey, a borough in Salem County
Penns Hall, a hotel and country club in England
Penns railway station, a former station in the West Midlands, England

In Pennsylvania:
Penns Creek, a tributary of the Susquehanna River
Penns Creek, Pennsylvania, a village in Snyder County
Penn's Landing, the waterfront area of the Center City along the Delaware River section of Philadelphia